Fairview Park is a city in Cuyahoga County, Ohio, United States. A  suburb of Cleveland, it once formed part of the historical Rockport Township, along with the area of West Park and the suburbs of Lakewood and Rocky River. It borders Cleveland to the east, Westlake and North Olmsted to the west, Rocky River and Lakewood to the north and Brook Park to the south. At the 2010 census, the city population was 16,826.

History 

Fairview Park was originally part of Rockport Township, later the Rocky River hamlet. The hamlet was incorporated as a village in 1903 and was split in 1910, with the northern part of the region becoming Rocky River and the southern part assuming the name Goldwood. Part of the Goldwood Township was later annexed to Rocky River and Goldwood would subsequently be incorporated as a separate village. Afterwards, Goldwood was split into two regions. A large portion of the land to the north became the Village of Fairview (later Fairview Village). Meanwhile, the remaining land located in the southwest corner and land along Center Ridge Road remained as Goldwood and was later incorporated as a village. By 1925, the remaining Goldwood region was renamed Parkview.

Both Fairview Village and Parkview remained small suburbs of its neighboring Cleveland (which had annexed most of what was West Park in 1923). In 1929, an economic recession in Fairview led to consideration of annexation to Cleveland. However, the plan never went to the ballot and Fairview maintained its independence. In 1948, Fairview became Fairview Park. Much of the growth of this region did not take place until after World War II. Most notably, the village began attracting former Cleveland residents when Fairview Shopping Center opened in 1947 on Lorain Road. In 1950, the village's size exceeded 5,000 at 9,234 and became the City of Fairview Park. The first city charter was adopted in November 1958. The remaining Parkview region was later annexed to Fairview in 1967.

Geography

Demographics
93.3% spoke English, 1.5% Spanish, 1.0% Arabic, and 0.7% Hungarian.

2010 census
As of the census of 2010, there were 16,826 people, 7,564 households, and 4,461 families residing in the city. The racial makeup of the city was 94.4% White, 1.8% Black, 0.1% Native American, 1.6% Asian, 0.8% from other races, and 1.2% from two or more races. Hispanic or Latino of any race were 3.3% of the population.

Of the city's population over the age of 25, 38.0% hold a bachelor's degree or higher.

There were 7,564 households, of which 26.2% had children under the age of 18 living with them, 46.3% were married couples living together, 9.5% had a female householder with no husband present, 3.2% had a male householder with no wife present, and 41.0% were non-families. 35.7% of all households were made up of individuals, and 13.8% had someone living alone who was 65 years of age or older. The average household size was 2.22 and the average family size was 2.93.

The median age in the city was 42.3 years. 21.1% of residents were under the age of 18; 6.3% were between the ages of 18 and 24; 26% were from 25 to 44; 29.8% were from 45 to 64; and 16.8% were 65 years of age or older. The gender makeup of the city was 47.9% male and 52.1% female.

2000 census
At the 2000 census, there were 17,572 people, 7,856 households and 4,713 families residing in the city. The population density was 3,742.2 per square mile (1,443.5/km). There were 8,152 housing units at an average density of 1,736.1 per square mile (669.7/km). The racial makeup of the city was 95.97% White, 0.64% Black, 0.10% Native American, 1.57% Asian, 0.02% Pacific Islander, 0.36% from other races, and 1.33% from two or more races. Hispanic or Latino of any race were 1.50% of the population. Ancestries include German (29.7%), Irish (26.7%), English (10.7%), Polish (8.9%), Italian (8.8%), and Slovak (5.6%).

There were 7,856 households, of which 25.7% had children under the age of 18 living with them, 48.6% were married couples living together, 8.7% had a female householder with no husband present, and 40.0% were non-families. 36.0% of all households were made up of individuals, and 15.2% had someone living alone who was 65 years of age or older. The average household size was 2.24 and the average family size was 2.96.

22.2% of the population were under the age of 18, 5.7% from 18 to 24, 29.1% from 25 to 44, 23.8% from 45 to 64, and 19.1% who were 65 years of age or older. The median age was 41 years. For every 100 females, there were 88.7 males. For every 100 females age 18 and over, there were 84.5 males.

The median household income was $50,487 and the median family income was $62,803. Males had a median income of $45,318 compared with $33,565 for females. The per capita income for the city was $27,662. About 2.4% of families and 4.1% of the population were below the poverty line, including 4.6% of those under age 18 and 3.6% of those age 65 or over.

Economy
The city of Fairview Park contains two large shopping centers, Westgate Mall and Fairview Center.

Notable people
 Tom Cousineau – NFL football player – Cleveland Browns linebacker
 Mary Bridget Davies - Tony nominated American singer from her work on Broadway as Janis Joplin in “Janis in A Night”
 Matthew Glave – actor
 Matt Kata – baseball  infielder for the Houston Astros
 Holly Laessig - professional American singer from the band Lucius
 Terrence McDonnell – television writer/producer
 Jamie Mueller – NFL football player – Buffalo Bills fullback
 John Jude Palencar – illustrator of over 100 other books and cover of Eragon
 Sally Priesand – first female rabbi ordained in the United States
 M. Frank Rudy – patented the cushioning system trademarked by Nike as the Nike "Air" sole
 Dan Sullivan – United States Senator from Alaska

References

Further reading
 The Encyclopedia Of Cleveland History by Cleveland Bicentennial Commission (Cleveland, Ohio), David D. Van Tassel (editor), and John J. Grabowski (Editor) 
 From Rockport to West Park by Ralph A. Pfingsten 
 Fairview Park in Historical Review by Margaret Schaefer Goebelt ISBN B0006CZE76
   Fairview Park by Frank Barnett

External links
 City of Fairview Park

Cities in Ohio
Cities in Cuyahoga County, Ohio
Populated places established in 1903
1903 establishments in Ohio
Cleveland metropolitan area